The third season of Teenage Mutant Ninja Turtles aired in syndication. For most of this season, the Technodrome is located at the Earth's core. Transport modules with drills are used to travel between the Technodrome and the Earth's surface.

Episodes

References

External links
IMDB
TV Com

Teenage Mutant Ninja Turtles (1987 TV series) seasons
1989 American television seasons
South Dakota in fiction
Florida in fiction
Fiction about meteoroids
Parallel universes in fiction
Floods in fiction
Fiction about the Sun
Fiction set around Polaris
Antares in fiction
Fiction about consciousness transfer
Subterranean fiction
Television series set in feudal Japan
Usagi Yojimbo